Double Team is a 1997 American action comedy film directed by Tsui Hark in his American directorial debut and starring Jean-Claude Van Damme, Dennis Rodman, and Mickey Rourke.  Van Damme plays counter-terrorist agent Jack Quinn, who is assigned to bring an elusive terrorist known as Stavros to justice. Things become personal when Stavros kidnaps Quinn's pregnant wife after his own lover and child were killed in an assassination attempt that went awry. Aiding Quinn in his rescue is his flamboyant weapons dealer Yaz (Dennis Rodman).

This film received negative reviews and was a box office bomb.
The film was also nominated for and "won" three Golden Raspberry Awards: Worst Supporting Actor (Rodman), Worst New Star (also Rodman), and Worst Screen Couple (Rodman and Van Damme).

Plot
After retrieving a truck load of plutonium stolen from a US military base in Croatia by freelance international terrorist Stavros, anti-terrorist agent Jack Paul Quinn retires to Southern France with Kathryn, his pregnant wife. A government representative tells Quinn that Stavros, Quinn's nemesis, has become active again and convinces Quinn to come out of retirement.

Quinn travels to Antwerp, Belgium where quirky arms dealer Yaz outfits him. Quinn and his team track Stavros to an amusement park, but Quinn hesitates to shoot Stavros when he sees Stavros is meeting with his six-year-old son. Stavros exploits Quinn's hesitation and a shootout ensues. Stavros' son is killed. Stavros flees into a hospital, pursued by Quinn. Stavros and Quinn fight in the maternity ward, and Quinn is knocked unconscious by an explosion.

Due to his hesitation, Quinn is declared killed in action and placed in 'The Colony', an invisible penal island for secret agents. The occupants of the Colony are expected to analyze terrorist threats and register themselves every day using a fingerprint scanner. While analyzing information from a terrorist bombing, Quinn picks up a message from Stavros telling him that Stavros has kidnapped Kathryn. Quinn slices off the skin of his fingertip and puts it into an automated device to fool the fingerprint scanner, then escapes the energy field surrounding the island by attaching himself to cargo due to be extracted from the air. Another agent on the Colony, Goldsmythe, is activated as Quinn's "guardian", responsible for tracking him down.

Quinn enlists Yaz's assistance by promising access to CIA bank accounts. The two go to Quinn's house, where they are ambushed by Stavros' men. After fighting the men off, Quinn receives a message from Stavros telling him that he must go to Rome for his baby's sake. When they arrive in Rome, Quinn admits to Yaz that the bank accounts are empty, and he has nothing to offer for Yaz's services, but a promise to repay him. However, Yaz volunteers his help after he learns that Quinn's wife is pregnant from a sonogram delivered to the given rendezvous. Quinn emails Stavros encouraging him to meet in a town square.

At the meeting point, Quinn catches sight of Kathryn in a car but is intercepted by Stavros and a shootout occurs as Kathryn is driven away. Quinn tracks Stavros' sniper to the hotel suite where Kathryn was being held and finds a clue to her whereabouts: a prescription bottle label. With the help of an order of monks Yaz has equipped with computers and Internet access, Quinn reaches the hospital. He finds Kathryn has given birth and Stavros has taken his son. Quinn locates Stavros and the baby in a Roman amphitheater. Stavros leaves Quinn in the middle of a minefield with his son and a tiger.

Yaz arrives on a motorbike and snatches the baby, leaving Quinn to escape from the tiger and go after Stavros. While Quinn and Stavros fight in the minefield, Yaz moves the markers, leading Stavros to step on a mine, unable to move without setting it off. Goldsmythe, who has tracked Quinn, finds the baby; Quinn, his son, Goldsmythe and Yaz run as Stavros is charged by the tiger and takes his foot off the mine. They take shelter from the explosion behind a vending machine. Goldsmythe asks Quinn for his hair and shirt as proof that he successfully tracked him; Yaz drops a smoke bomb, allowing Quinn to escape.

Cast
Jean-Claude Van Damme as Jack Paul Quinn, a government counter-terrorist agent, forced out of retirement by the kidnapping of his pregnant wife, Kathryn, by Stavros.
Dennis Rodman as Yaz, an eccentric arms dealer. Yaz is based in or near Antwerp, Belgium, and boasts that he stocks military hardware so new that even he does not know he has it. Yaz initially agrees to help Quinn defeat Stavros after being offered access to CIA bank accounts but commits himself freely after discovering Kathryn is pregnant.
Paul Freeman as Alex Goldsmythe, a friend with whom Jack Quinn is reunited after arriving at the Colony and who Jack had previously thought dead. Alex is Jack's 'guardian'. Jack's welfare and performance is Alex's responsibility and Alex is involved with tracking Jack once he escapes the island.
Mickey Rourke as Stavros, an international terrorist. Stavros works freelance for any government willing to offer him sufficient financial incentive. At the start of the film, he is implicated in the theft of plutonium from a United States military base with the suggestion being that he intended to sell it to Iraq. He undertakes a personal vendetta against Quinn, blaming Quinn for the death of his son.

 Natacha Lindinger as Kathryn "Kath" Quinn, Jack's wife and a sculptor by trade. Kathryn and her then unborn son are kidnapped by Stavros.

Production

Filming

Double Team was filmed on location in Antwerp, Belgium; Nice and Arles, France; and Rome, Italy. Whilst the film implies that the climactic fight between Quinn and Stavros takes place in Rome's Colosseum, the scenes were actually filmed in and around the Arles Amphitheater in Southern France.

Score
Original music for Double Team was composed by Gary Chang, who had previously worked on films including The Breakfast Club and The Color of Money. The soundtrack includes songs by Joey Schwartz, Leareo Gianferrari, and Crystal Waters featuring Dennis Rodman.

Reception

Critical reception

Double Team attracted many negative reviews, holding a current score of 11% on review aggregation site Rotten Tomatoes. Rodman's contribution as Yaz attracted particular criticism with attention being brought to the character's esoteric fashion sense, one reviewer pointing out that "his hair covers all known hues of the spectrum." In addition, the film's plot and production was attacked by several reviewers for being unimaginative and impassive. The New York Times wrote that Double Teams "sets are impersonal. Actors sleepwalk. Scenes do not end, they just stop."

Criticism was not, however, universally negative. The Los Angeles Times referred to Double Team as "one of Van Damme's best" and continued to praise both Rodman's and Rourke's performances.  In addition, the film was awarded four stars out of five by boxoffice.com in a retrospective review written in 2008.

Audiences polled by CinemaScore gave the film an average grade of "B−" on an A+ to F scale.

Awards and nominations

References

External links
 
 
 

1990s English-language films
1990s buddy comedy films
1997 action comedy films
1997 films
1997 comedy films
American action comedy films
American buddy cop films
Columbia Pictures films
Fictional duos
Films about terrorism
Films directed by Tsui Hark
Films scored by Gary Chang
Films set in Antwerp
Films set in Belgium
Films set in France
Films set in Rome
Films shot in Antwerp
Mandalay Pictures films
Golden Raspberry Award winning films
1990s American films